Tamás Bódog (born 27 September 1970) is a retired Hungarian football player and He is currently assistant head coach of Hertha BSC. He is the former head coach  of Diósgyőr. He was replaced on 23 April 2018 by Fernando.

He made his debut for Hungary national team in 2000 when he played in the Bundesliga for 1. FSV Mainz 05.

Managerial career
On 9 March 2017, he was appointed as the manager of Diósgyőri VTK.
On 23 April 2018, he was sacked from Diósgyőr.

In 2020 he was appointed as the manager of the Nemzeti Bajnokság I club Kisvárda FC.

References

External links

Tamas Bodog at Sportnet.at

1970 births
Living people
Sportspeople from Dunaújváros
Hungarian footballers
Hungary international footballers
Pécsi MFC players
Hungarian expatriate footballers
Bundesliga players
2. Bundesliga players
SSV Ulm 1846 players
Expatriate footballers in Germany
Hungarian expatriate sportspeople in Germany
SpVgg Au/Iller players
1. FSV Mainz 05 players
Hungarian football managers
Diósgyőri VTK managers
Association football defenders
Kisvárda FC managers
Budapest Honvéd FC managers
Brøndby IF non-playing staff
Nemzeti Bajnokság I managers